Sir Dermot Ó Seachnasaigh, Chief of the Name, died 1606. He was a son of Sir Ruaidhrí Gilla Dubh Ó Seachnasaigh and Lady Honora O'Brien, daughter of Murrough O'Brien, 1st Earl of Thomond.

Ó Seachnasaigh was in contention with his elder but illegitimate brother, John Ó Seachnasaigh, who till 1585 claimed lordship of Cenél Áeda. The two brothers travelled to Dublin to attend the 1585 Parliament, after which no more is heard of John until 1601.

Sir Dermot married Shyly Ni Hubert, and had issue Roger Gilla Dubh (born 1583), Dathi, William, Joan, Julia and Honora.

 William had sons William, Edmond, Roger and Dermot.
 Joan married Sir William Burke, and was the mother of Richard Burke, 6th Earl of Clanricarde.
 Julia married Teige O'Kelly of Gallagh.
 Honora married Johnock Burke of Tully.

References

 D'Alton, John, Illustrations, Historical and Genealogical, of King James's Irish Army List (1689). Dublin: 1st edition (single volume), 1855. pp. 328–32.
 History of Galway, James Hardiman, 1820
 Tabular pedigrees of O'Shaughnessy of Gort (1543–1783), Martin J. Blake, Journal of the Galway Archaeological and Historical Society, vi (1909–10), p. 64; vii (1911–12), p. 53.
 John O'Donovan. The Genealogies, Tribes, and Customs of Hy-Fiachrach. Dublin: Irish Archaeological Society. 1844. Pedigree of O'Shaughnessy: pp. 372–91.
 Old Galway, Professor Mary Donovan O'Sullivan, 1942
 Galway: Town and Gown, edited Moran et al., 1984
 Galway: History and Society, 1996

People from County Galway
Dermot
16th-century Irish people
17th-century Irish people